Kenneth George Webster (born 1964) is a British hypnotist. He has played Blackpool Pleasure Beach for 31 years, making it the longest running hypnosis show in the world. He has also appeared on Ant & Dec's Saturday Night Takeaway.

In 2011 Webster was the guest interviewee on an episode of Backstage Blackpool. In 2012 he won a Scarborough based episode of Come Dine with Me.

Webster also runs an entertainment agency and weight loss centre.

References

External links
www.kenwebster.biz — Ken Websters Official Website

Living people
British hypnotists
1964 births
People from Scarborough, North Yorkshire
People educated at Scarborough College